10 from 6 (also known as 10/6) is a compilation album released by English supergroup Bad Company in December 1985 on Atlantic Records label. All the songs on the album were previously released on Swan Song Records, a record label begun by Led Zeppelin in 1974. The title refers to the album's 10 songs taken from the six albums Bad Company had recorded to that time, though no songs from Burnin' Sky appear in the album.

Track listing

Personnel 
Per liner notes
Paul Rodgers – vocals, second guitar, piano, producer
Mick Ralphs – guitar, keyboards on "Ready for Love", producer
Boz Burrell – bass, producer
Simon Kirke – drums, producer

Production 
Aubrey Powell Productions – sleeve design
Richard Evans – sleeve design
Barry Diament – mastering

Certifications

References 

Bad Company compilation albums
1985 greatest hits albums
Atlantic Records compilation albums
Swan Song Records compilation albums